2002 Dove Award Nominees for the thirty-third annual ceremony of the Dove Awards.

Nominees

Song of the Year
 "Above All"; Lenny LeBlanc, Paul Baloche; Integrity Hosanna! Music, LenSongs Publishing (ASCAP)
 "Alive"; Paul Sandoval, Marcos Curiel, Mark Traa Daniels, Noah C. Bernardo Jr.; Souljah Music, Famous Music Publishing, ASCAP
 "Call On Jesus"; Nicole C. Mullen; Word Spring Music, Lil' Jas Music (SESAC)
 "God Is God"; Steven Curtis Chapman; Peach Hill Songs (BMI)
 "God Of Wonders"; Marc Byrd, Steve Hindalong; New Spring Publishing, Never Say Never Songs (ASCAP), StormBoy Music (BMI)
 "I Can Only Imagine"; Bart Mallard; Simpleville Music (ASCAP)
 "Live Out Loud"; Steven Curtis Chapman, Geoff Moore; Peach Hill Songs (BMI), Geoff Moore Songs (SESAC)
 "Press On"; Dan Burgess; Belwin-Mills Publishing (ASCAP)
 "Wait For Me"; Rebecca St. James; Up In The Mix Music, Bibbitsong Music (BMI)
 "Welcome Home"; Shaun Groves; New Spring Publishing (ASCAP)

Male Vocalist of the Year
 David Phelps
 Mac Powell
 Mark Schultz
 Michael W. Smith
 Steven Curtis Chapman

Female Vocalist of the Year
 CeCe Winans
 Natalie Grant
 Nichole Nordeman
 Nicole C. Mullen
 Rebecca St. James

Group of the Year
 Avalon
 P.O.D.
 Point of Grace
 Selah
 Third Day

Artist of the Year
 Michael W. Smith
 Nicole C. Mullen
 P.O.D.
 Steven Curtis Chapman
 Third Day

New Artist of the Year
 downhere
 Joy Williams
 Sara Groves
 Shaun Groves
 ZOEgirl

Producer of the Year
 Brown Bannister
 Kirk Franklin
 Monroe Jones
 Steve Hindalong
 Toby McKeehan

Rap/Hip Hop/Dance Recorded Song of the Year
 "40"; Rhythm of Remembrance; Apt.core; U2; Rocketown
 "Dance El Ritmo"; Dance El Ritmo; Freddie Colloca; Freddie Colloca, Jose Garces Jr., Alvaro Lopez; One Voice
 "Divine Inspiration"; Are We There Yet?; John Reuben; John Zappin, Todd Collins, Alan Auguste; Gotee
 "Reborn"; Transform; Rebecca St. James;  Matt Bronleewe; ForeFront
 "Ride Wit Me"; The Last Street Preacha; T-Bone; T-Bone, Chase; Flicker
 "Somebody's Watching Me"; Momentum; Toby Mac; Toby McKeehan, Michael Anthony Taylor, Rockwell; ForeFront

Modern Rock/Alternative Recorded Song of the Year
 "Can't Erase It"; If I Left the Zoo; Jars of Clay; Dan Haseltine, Matt Odmark, Stephen Mason, Charlie Lowell; Essential
 "For the Love of God"; Transform; Rebecca St. James; Rebecca St. James, Matt Bronleewe; ForeFront
 "God, You Are My God"; Glo; Delirious?; Stuart Garrard; Sparrow
 "Hey, Hey"; The Big Surprise; The Elms; Owen Thomas, Brent Milligan; Sparrow
 "How Long?"; Untitled; The Benjamin Gate; Andrienne Lisching, Marc Theodosiou, Marc Pautz, Costa Balamatsias, Chris Poisat; Brett Palmer; ForeFront
 "Invade My Soul"; Invade My Soul; By the Tree; Chuck Dennie; Fervent

Hard Music Recorded Song of the Year
 "9 Out Of 10"; Life Outside The Toybox; Justifide; Jason Moncivaiz, Sambo Moncivaiz, Joey Avalos; Ardent
 "Live For Him"; Above; Pillar; Rob Beckley, Travis Jenkins, Brad Noone, Michael Wittig; Flicker
 "Perfect"; The Hammering Process; Living Sacrifice; Living Sacrifice; Solid State
 "Song X"; The Light In Guinevere's Garden; East West; East West; Floodgate
 "Use Me"; Out Of My Mind; G S Megaphone; Randy Shreve; Spindust

Rock Recorded Song of the Year
 "Alien Youth"; Alien Youth; Skillet; John L. Cooper; Ardent
 "Barlow Girls"; Karaoke Superstars; Superchick; Max Hsu; inpop
 "Born Again"; Born Again; Pete Orta; Natalie Hemby, Jay Joyce; Word
 "Come Together"; Come Together; Third Day; Tai Anderson, Brad Avery, David Carr, Mark Lee, Mac Powell; Essential
 "Extreme Days"; Solo; TobyMac; Jamie Rowe, Toby McKeehan, Michael Anthony Taylor, David Bach; ForeFront
 "Will Not Fade"; Hit Parade; Audio Adrenaline; Bob Herdman, Mark Stuart, Will McGinniss, Tyler Burkam, Ben Cissell; ForeFront

Pop/Contemporary Recorded Song of the Year
 "Blue Skies"; Free To Fly; Point of Grace; Matt Huesmann, Grant Cunningham; Word
 "Call On Jesus"; Talk About It; Nicole C. Mullen; Nicole C. Mullen; Word
 "I Can Only Imagine"; Almost There; MercyMe; Bart Mallard; INO
 "Live Out Loud"; Declaration; Steven Curtis Chapman; Steven Curtis Chapman, Geoff Moore; Sparrow
 "Welcome Home"; Invitation to Eavesdrop; Shaun Groves; Shaun Groves; Rocketown

Inspirational Recorded Song of the Year
 "Above All"; Worship; Michael W. Smith; Lenny LeBlanc, Paul Baloche; Reunion
 "Every Season"; This Mystery; Nichole Nordeman; Nichole Nordeman; Sparrow
 "He Sends His Love"; Free To Fly; Point of Grace; Jeremy Bose, Paul Evans; Word
 "The Glory"; Oxygen; Avalon; Jim Cooper, Regie Hamm; Sparrow
 "Wonderful, Merciful Saviour"; Press On; Selah; Dawn Rodgers, Eric Wyse; Curb

Southern Gospel Recorded Song of the Year
 "Day Three"; Day Three; Lord Song; Jerry Salley; Daywind
 "He's Watching Me"; I Do Believe; Gaither Vocal Band; Tina Sadler; Spring Hill
 "The Blood Cried Out"; Never Alone; Ernie Haase; Jeff Steele, Amy Keefer; Daywind
 "The Truth Is"; A Taste Of Grace; Karen Peck and New River; John Darin Rowsey; Spring Hill
 "There'll Come A Day"; Lovin' This Livin' For The Lord; Brian Free and Assurance; Jeff Steele, Cindi Ballard; Daywind

Bluegrass Recorded Song of the Year
 "Above and Beyond"; So Fine; Lewis Family; Gene Pistilli, Billy Davis; Thoroughbred
 "Face To Face With Amazing Grace"; The Chigger Hill Boys & Terri; The Chigger Hill Boys & Terri; Mike Richards, Rodney Lay, JR.; Matorlick
 "Just A Prayer Away"; Grass Covered Tracks; Wade Spencer; Gerald Crabb; Model
 "Thank You, Lord, For Your Blessings On Me"; By Request, Their Greatest Hits; Easter Brothers; Russell Easter, James Easter, Edd Easter; Thoroughbred
 "The Lamb Is Within"; Pocket Full of Seeds; Standing Tall; Billy Fields; Independent

Country Recorded Song of the Year
 "Come Spring"; The Gift; Jessica King; Dottie Rambo; Journey
 "Goin' Away Party"; Ordinary Day; Jeff & Sheri Easter; Bruce Haynes; Spring Hill
 "I See"; Day Three; Lord Song; Joe Johnston, Kim Patton-Johnston; Daywind
 "Thank God For The Preacher"; The Call; Mike Bowling; Gerald Crabb, Jason Crabb; Family
 "Will The Circle Be Unbroken"; Dave Moody; Dave Moody, Traditional; Lamon
 "Write Your Name Across My Heart"; From The Heart; The Oak Ridge Boys; Randy VanWarmer, Tony Harrell; Spring Hill

Urban Recorded Song of the Year
 "Different Now"; This Is Your Life; Out Of Eden; Lisa Kimmey, Lee Jerkins, David Hackley; Gotee
 "He's Been Good"; Virtuosity!; Virtue; Derek 'DOA' Allen, Juanita Wynn; Verity
 "I Believe I Can Fly"; The Experience; Yolanda Adams; R. Kelly; Elektra
 "It's Real"; Destiny; The Katinas; Joe Katina, James Katina, Mike Linney; Gotee
 "Thank You"; Kingdom Come, The Soundtrack; Kirk Franklin, Mary Mary; Kirk Franklin; GospoCentric

Traditional Gospel Recorded Song of the Year
 "Hold On"; Press On; Selah; Jesse Dixon; Curb
 "Marvelous"; The Storm Is Over; Bishop T.D. Jakes and the Potter's House Mass Choir; Myron Butler, Tedd Winn; EMI Gospel
 "My Everything (Praise Waiteth)"; Persuaded - Live In DC; Richard Smallwood with Vision; Richard Smallwood; Verity
 "Stand"; Songs For The Soul; Daryl Coley, Marvin Sapp, Helen Baylor, Maurette Brown-Clark; Donnie McClurkin; Harborwood
 "Steal Away To Jesus"; Hymns; Shirley Caesar, Michelle Williams; Public Domain; Word

Contemporary Gospel Recorded Song of the Year
 "'Bout It"; No Limit; Willie Norwood; William Carter, Jr.; Atlantic
 "Anybody Wanna Pray?"; CeCe Winans; CeCe Winans; Cedric Caldwell, Victor Caldwell, Margaret Bell, Tommy Sims; Wellspring Gospel
 "Let There Be Praise"; Joe Pace Presents: Let There Be Praise; Joe Pace, Alvin Slaughter; Joe Pace; Integrity
 "The Storm Is Over"; The Storm Is Over; Bishop T.D. Jakes and the Potter's House Mass Choir; R. Kelly; EMI Gospel
 "There's A Liftin' of the Hands"; New Season; Israel Houghten; Tim Johnson; Hosanna!

Rap/Hip Hop/Dance Album of the Year
 Full Plates Mix Tape 002; DJ Maj; Todd Collins, "Pigeon" John Dunkin, Ric "Form" Robbins, Flynn Adams Atkins, C. Cooper, Stro the 89th, Play-Dough, Don Baker, Walter Grier, DJ One Love; Gotee
 Keepin It Real; Priesthood; Jyro Xhan, Swift; Metro1 Music
 Momentum; TobyMac; Toby Mac; ForeFront
 Rhythm of Remembrance; Apt.core; Will Hunt, Tom Laune, Don Donahue; Rocketown
 The Last Street Preacha; T-Bone; Chase; Flicker

Modern Rock/Alternative Album of the Year
 Alien Youth; Skillet; John L. Cooper; Ardent
 Invade My Soul; By The Tree; Steve Hindalong, Bob Wohler; Fervent
 Stereotype Be; Kevin Max; Kevin Max, Adrian Belew; ForeFront
 The Big Surprise; The Elms; Brent Milligan; Sparrow
 Untitled; The Benjamin Gate; Quinlan; ForeFront

Hard Music Album of the Year
 Facing Changes; Hangnail; Bill Stevenson, Stephen Egerton; BEC
 Greatest Hits; Spoken; Dan Garcia, Jyro Xhan, Barry Poynter; Metro1
 Life Outside The Toybox; Justifide; Billy Smiley; Ardent
 The Hammering Process; Living Sacrifice; Barry Poynter, Lance Garvin, Bruce Fitzhugh, Rocky Gray, Arthur Green, Matthew Putman; Solid State
 The Light In Guinevere's Garden; East West; Bob Burch; Floodgate
 Well-Adjusted; Beanbag; Beanbag, Mark McElligott; Inpop

Rock Album of the Year
 Big Tent Revival Live; Big Tent Revival; Dana Key, Steve Wiggins, Randy Williams, Spence Smith, Steve Dale; Ardent
 Come Together; Third Day; Monroe Jones; Essential
 Empty; Tait; Michael Tait, Pete Stewart; ForeFront
 Karaoke Superstars; Superchick; Bill Deaton, Matt
Dally, Ben Dally, Max Hsu, Melissa Brock, Tricia Brock, Andrew Wilson, Dave Ghazarian; Inpop
 Out Of My Mind; G S Megaphone; Skidd Mills; Spindust

Pop/Contemporary Album of the Year
 Declaration; Steven Curtis Chapman; Brown Bannister, Steven Curtis Chapman; Sparrow
 Free To Fly; Point of Grace; David Tyson, Brown Bannister, Nathan Nockels, Tom Laune, Glen Garrett, Wayne Tester; Word
 Have I Ever Told You?; FFH; Scott Williamson, David Hamilton; Essential
 Invitation to Eavesdrop; Shaun Groves; Monroe Jones; Rocketown
 Oxygen; Avalon; Brown Bannister; Sparrow
 Talk About It; Nicole C. Mullen; Justin Niebank, David Mullen, Nicole C. Mullen; Word

Inspirational Album of the Year
 David Phelps; David Phelps; Phil Naish; Spring Hill
 Glorify, Edify, Testify; The Martins; Bill Baumgart, Robert White Johnson, Matt Huesmann; Spring Hill
 Light Of The World; The Brooklyn Tabernacle Choir; Carol Cymbala, Lari Goss, Oliver Wells; M2.O
 Press On; Selah; Jason Kyle, Todd Smith, Allan Hall, Nicol Smith; Curb
 The Christmas Shoes; NewSong; Bill Baumgart, Don Koch, George King, Michael O'Brien, Leonard Ahlstrom; Reunion

Southern Gospel Album of the Year
 Day Three; Lord Song; Wayne Haun, Eddie Howard; Daywind
 Encore; Old Friends Quartet; Bill Gaither, Wesley Pritchard, Ben Speer; Spring House
 Glory Mountain; The Greenes; Tim Greene; New Haven * No Distractions; CrossWay; Garry Jones, Michael Sykes, Bill Gaither; Spring Hill
 Pressed Down, Shaken Together, Running Over; Gold City; Mark Trammell; Daywind

Country Album of the Year
 From The Heart; The Oak Ridge Boys; Michael Sykes, Duane Allen; Spring Hill
 God Is Love: The Gospel Sessions; Ann-Margret, James Blackwood, The Jordanaires, The Light Crust Doughboys; Art Greenhaw; Art Greenhaw
 Inspired; Lulu Roman; Wayne Haun, Mark Guigeria; Hendrix
 It Feels Like Christmas Again; Jeff & Sheri Easter; Michael Sykes; Spring Hill
 My Gospel Hymnal; Susie Luchsinger; Billy Aerts; New Haven

Urban Album of the Year
 Dear Lord; Remixx; Phillip Armstrong; Word
 Just Remember Christmas; Fred Hammond; Fred Hammond; Verity
 Love Letters; Londa Larmond; Michael Anthony Taylor, Asaph A. Ward, Sanchez Harley, Carlos Pennell, Montrel Darrett, Londa Larmond, Renee Rowe; EMI Gospel
 No Compromise; Rufus Troutman; Rufus Troutman; Marxan
 Soul Inspiration; LeJuene Thompson; Cedric Thompson; EMI Gospel
 Virtuosity!; Virtue; Derek "DOA" Allen, Kevin Bond, Joey Kibble, Mark Kibble, Sean K Hall, Tone?x, Fred Jerkins; Verity

Traditional Gospel Album of the Year
 Doug and Melvin Williams Duets; Doug Williams, Melvin Williams, Lee Williams, Yolanda Adams, Harvet Watkins Jr, Joe Ligon, Marvin Winans, John P. Kee, Shirley Caesar, Duranice, Lydia Brice; Melvin Williams, Doug Williams, Henry Green; Blackberry
 Hymns; Shirley Caesar; Bubba Smith, Shirley Caesar, Michael Mathis; Word
 I'm Blessed; Lou Rawls; Rev. Milton Biggham; Malaco 
 Persuaded - Live In DC; Richard Smallwood with Vision; Richard Smallwood; Verity
 Spirit Of The Century; The Blind Boys Of Alabama; John Chelew; EMI Gospel

Contemporary Gospel Album of the Year
 CeCe Winans; CeCe Winans; Brown Bannister, Robbie Buchanon, Tommy Sims; Wellspring Gospel
 Joe Pace Presents - Let There Be Praise; Joe Pace; Joe Pace; Integrity Music
 The Experience; Yolanda Adams; Raymond Reeder; Elektra
 The Storm Is Over; Bishop T.D. Jakes & The Potter's House Mass Choir; Kevin Bond, Sanchez Harley; EMI Gospel
 Worship In His Presence; In His Presence Live; Paul Wright III, Frederick L. Vaughn, Ralph Lofton; Harborwood

Instrumental Album of the Year
 Christmas Extraordinaire; Mannheim Steamroller; Chip Davis; American Gramaphone
 Freedom; Michael W. Smith; Michael W. Smith, Bryan Lenox; Reunion
 Gospel Instrumental; Dottie Leonard Miller, Ed Leonard, Craig Minor; Vital
 Living Room Sessions: Hymns; Chris Rice; Chris Rice, Monroe Jones; Rocketown
 Redeemer; Fletch Wiley; Fletch Wiley, David Winkler; Word Music

Praise & Worship Album of the Year
 In The Company Of Angels - A Call To Worship; Caedmon's Call; Joshua Moore, Bob Boyd, Todd Bragg, Garett Buell, Jeff Miller, Derek Webb, Cliff Young, Danielle Young; Essential
 Let My Words Be Few; Phillips, Craig and Dean; Nathan Nockels; Sparrow
 Much; Ten Shekel Shirt; Lamont Hiebert, Barry Patterson; Vertical Music
 Worship; Michael W. Smith; Michael W. Smith, Tom Laune; Reunion
 You Are My World; Darlene Zschech; Darlene Zschech; Hillsong Music, Integrity

Children's Music Album of the Year
 Baby Bible Songs; Mike Gay, Sue Martin Gay, Christopher Davis, Matt Huesmann; Cedarmont
 Bedtime Prayers Lullabies and Peaceful Worship; Twila Paris; John Hartley, Derald Daugherty; Sparrow
 Operation Christmas Child; Kathie Hill; Kathie Hill Music, Word Music
 Shout to the Lord Kids; Jeff Sandstrom; Integrity Music
 Songtime Kids, All New Bible Songs; Dennis Dearing; Loving Care Children

Spanish Language Album of the Year
 Camino Largo; Fernando Ortega; John Andrew Schreiner; Word
 Destino; The Katinas; Bryan Lenox, Mookie Taylor, Michael Linney, Aurel M, Joe Katina, James Katina, John Katina, Jesse Katina, Sam Katina; Gotee
 El Amor Tiene Un Valor; Ileana Garces; Alvaro Lopez, Jose L Garces; One Voice
 Mi Corazon; Jaci Velasquez; Emilio Estefan, Jr., Rudy Perez, Mark Heimermann, Alberto Gaitin, Ricardo Gaitin, Alejandro Jean, Freddy Pinero, Jr., Lewis Martinee, Jose Miguel Velasquez; Word
 Susana Allen; Susana Allen; Alejandro Allen; Piedra Angular

Special Event Album of the Year
 Happy Christmas 3; O.C Supertones, Relient K, Bleach, Cadet, Earthsuit, Kendall Payne, Hangnail, Poor Old Lu, Joy Electric, Denison Witmer, Ace Troubleshooter, Starflyer 59, Aaron Sprinkle, Skyline Drive, Matthew Thiessen and the Earthquakes; Brandon Ebel; BEC
 In Case You Missed It... And Then Some; Fred Hammond, Charles Laster, Candace Laster, Jonathan Dunn, amKenyon M. Donald, Darrin Patterson, Keith Staten, Duawne Starling, Tiffany Palmer, Joan, Rosario, The Singletons, Brian J. Pratt, Frederick J. Purifoy II, Marcus Cole, Bridgette Campbell, Shea Norman, Kayla Parker, Resurrection, Howard Smith, Lisa Scott-Baily, Donald Hayes; Fred Hammond; Verity
 Kingdom Come, The Soundtrack; Kirk Franklin, Jill Scott, Carl Thomas, Natalie and SOP, Shawn Stockman, Mary Mary, Deborah Cox, Trin-i-tee 5:7, Crystal Lewis, Tamar Braxton, Kurt Carr, Tamela Mann, Az Yet, Ashley Guilbert, Shanika Leeks, Caltomeesh West, Bishop Kenneth Ulmer; Kirk Franklin; GospoCentric
 Prayer of Jabez; Sarah Sadler, Margeret Becker, Geoff Moore, Steve Reischl, Erin O'Donnell, Adrienne Liesching, Jamie Rowe, Phil Keaggy, Rebecca St. James, Michael Tait, Jill Phillips, Kevin Max; John Hartley, David Zaffiro; ForeFront
 Soul Lift; Johnny Cash, John Ellis, Vestal Goodman, LaRue, Sarah Macintosh, DJ Maj, Steve Mason, Mike Roe, Mark Stuart, Russ Taff, The Benjamin Gate, T-Bone; Mark Stuart, Bob Herdman, Will McGinniss, Rick Altizer; Flicker
 We Will Know Peace; The Perrys, Gold City, Greater Vision, The Steeles, Lord Song, Cumberland Quartet, The Paynes, Brian Free, Southern Brothers, Trevecca Nazarene Choir; Wayne Haun; Daywind

Musical of the Year
 He Chose The Nails; Bryan Lenox, Glenn Wagner; Here To Him
 Light Of The World; Carol Cymbala, Jim Cymbala; Brooklyn Tabernacle
 One King; Robert Sterling, Lowell Alexander, Deborah Craig-Claar; Word
 Start At The Manger; Dave Williamson, David Guthrie; Word
 We Will Know Peace; Wayne Haun; Lorenz

Youth/Children's Musical of the Year
 All I Want for Christmas; Dennis Allen, Nan Allen; Brentwood Kids Music
 Jailhouse Rock; David T. Clydesdale, Celeste Clydesdale; Clydesdale & Clydesdale
 Operation Christmas Child; Chris Marion, Kathie Hill; Kathie Hill Music
 The Noise We Make; Karla Worley, Robert Sterling; Word
 We Are United; Pam Andrews, Johnathan Crumpton, Meredith Graham; Brentwood Kids

Choral Collection of the Year
 God of Wonders; Steven V. Taylor, Johnathan Crumpton; Brentwood
 Great Choirs Of America; David Byerly, Lari Goss, John Elefante, Dino Elefante; Word
 Let Heaven and Nature Swing; Don Marsh; Genevox
 Marching To Zion; Mike Speck, Lari Goss, Danny Zaloudik; Word
 Offer Up This Praise; Geron Davis, Bradley Knight; Brentwood-Benson

Recorded Music Packaging of the Year
 6.1; Out Of The Grey; Karianne Caulkins; Linda Bourdeaux; Jimmy Abegg; Rocketown
 Any Given Day; Earth To Heaven; Cadet; David Dobson; BEC
 Freedom; Michael W. Smith; Tim Parker; Tim Parker; Andrew Southam; Reunion
 In The Company Of Angels - A Call To Worship; Caedmon's Call; Cliff Young, Jordyn Thomas, Ron Roark; Ron Roark; David Dobson, Tim Parker, Kim Thomas; Essential
 Zao; Zao; Don Clark; Don Clark; David Johnson; Solid State

Short Form Music Video of the Year
 "All Over Me"; The Benjamin Gate; Randy Brewer; Roman White; ForeFront
 "Call On Jesus"; Nicole C. Mullen; Randy Brewer; Jeffrey Phillips; Word
 "Everything"; Delirious?; Richard Fenton; Andy Hutch; Sparrow
 "Extreme Days"; Toby Mac; Karen Martin; Eric Welch; ForeFront
 "I Have Been There"; Mark Schultz; Randy Brewer; Jeff Phillips; Word
 "Reborn"; Rebecca St. James; Karen Martin; Eric Welch; ForeFront
 "You Already Take Me There"; Switchfoot; Brandon Dickerson; Brandon Dickerson; Sparrow

Long Form Music Video
 30th Anniversary Reunion; The Paynes; Keith Payne, Mike Payne, Wayne Haun; David Brainard; Daywind
 Bill & Gloria Gaither Present A Billy Graham Music Homecoming, Vol. 1; Bill & Gloria Gaither and the Homecoming Friends; Bill Gaither; Luke Renner; Spring House
 He Chose The Nails; Kim Hill, Natalie Grant, Jeff Deyo, Twila Paris, Wes King, Oak Hills Church Choir; Glenn Wagner, Ozzie Mills; Ozzie Mills; Here To Him
 Third Day Live In Concert - The Offerings Experience; Third Day; Michael Sacci; Carl Diebold; CT Ventures
 You Are My World; Darlene Zschech; Mark Zschech; Dennis Murphy; Hillsong Music Australia; Integrity

Nominees 2002
Dove Award Nominees 2002